Hasta que la suegra nos separe is a 2016 Peruvian comedy film directed by Carlos Landeo and written by Diego Varela. Starring Roger Del Águila, Carlos Álvarez and Giovanna Valcárcel.

Synopsis 
Lucho and Jenny are a middle-class married couple who are expecting a child. Lucho works in a restaurant and is fired, being forced to live in his mother-in-law's house. Coexistence becomes impossible, and her mother-in-law is tremendously nosy. In the midst of all the fighting, he suffered a blow to the head and as a result he had a conversation with his deceased father-in-law, who convinced him that his mother-in-law killed him. Lucho tells this to his soccer friends and together they look for a thousand ways to make her confess.

Cast 
The actors participating in this film are:

 Carlos Álvarez
 Leslie Shaw
 Róger del Águila
 Giovanna Valcárcel
 Jesús Delaveaux
 Manolo Rojas
 Alonso Cano
 Cecilia Tosso
 Ramón García

Production 
The film was released in theaters on August 25, 2016. Later, it was released in Colombia, Ecuador and Bolivia.

References

External links 

 

2016 films
2016 comedy films
Peruvian comedy films
Star Films films
2010s Peruvian films
2010s Spanish-language films

Films set in Peru
Films shot in Peru
Films about families